, better known by his stage name , was a Japanese actor, voice actor and narrator from Chiba Prefecture.

Besides his many narration and dubbing roles, he was also known for his roles in Time Bokan (as Perasuke), Yatterman (as Dokurobei), Mazinger Z (as Count Brocken), Tekkaman: The Space Knight (as Ranbos), Yuusha Raideen (as Barao), and for his narration roles in Burari Tochūgesha no Tabi and Pittankokan Kan.

Death
Takiguchi died at 7:33am JST on August 29, 2011, aged 80, from stomach cancer.

Filmography

Television animation
Courageous Cat and Minute Mouse (1960) – Narrator
Moomin (1969) – Moran
Andersen Stories (1971) - Mole
Mazinger Z (1972) – Count Brocken
New Moomin (1972) – Moran
We Know You, Moonlight Mask-kun! (1972) – Satan's Claw
Vicky the Viking (1974) – Snorre
Tekkaman: The Space Knight (1975) – Rambos
Time Bokan (1975) – Perasuke
Dinosaur War Izenborg (1977) – Gorou Kamihara, Dinosaur Emperor Ururu (Tyrannosaurus), Almost Dinosaur
Yatterman (1977) – Dokurobē
Nobody's Boy: Remi (1977-1978) - Driscoll
The Ultraman (1979) – Pig
Ninja Hattori-kun (1981) – Jippou
Minami no Niji no Lucy (1982) – Pettywell
Tokimeki Tonight (1982-1983) – Tamasaburo Kamiya
Dragon Ball (1986) – Baba Uranai
Dirty Pair (1987) – Masoho
Metal Armor Dragonar (1987) – Major Hydelnecken
Soreike! Anpanman (1988) – Santa Claus
Dragon Ball Z (1989) – Baba Uranai, Grand Elder, Porunga
Burn, Zantetsuken! (1994) – Chin Chin Chou
Montana Jones (1994) – Professor Nitro
Alice SOS (1998) – M-1
One Piece (1999) – Admiral Nelson
Tottoko Hamutarō (2000) – Maggie's Grandfather
UFO Baby (2000) – Professor Vincent
Alcatraz Connection (2001) – Howan
Cyborg 009: The Cyborg Soldier (2001) – Professor Kozumi
Astro Boy (2003) – Mr. Darling
Kaiketsu Zorori (2004) – Yokai Sensei 
Karin (2005) – narration
.hack//Roots (2006) – Phyllo
D.Gray-man (2006) – The Millennium Earl
Kirarin Revolution (2006) – Mister Danchō
Kurozuka (novel) (2008) – Man in Black
Dragon Ball Kai (2009) – Grand Elder
Brave Raideen[year needed] – Barao
Kochira Katsushika-ku Kameari Kōen-mae Hashutsujo – God
Mahōjin Guru Guru – Monburan
Urusei Yatsura – Red Mantle

Original video animation (OVA)
Sonic the Hedgehog (1996) – Dr. Robotnik
Slayers Gorgeous (1998) – Gaizno

Theatrical animation
Alice in Wonderland[year needed] (TBS edition) (Tweedle Dum and Tweedle Dee)
Darkwing Duck (Tuskernini)
The Incredibles (Ollie Johnston)
Lady and the Tramp (Trusty)
The Road to El Dorado (Chief Tannabok)
The Simpsons Movie (Abraham "Grandpa" Simpson)
Snow White and the Seven Dwarfs (Happy)
The Aristocats (Peppo the Italian Cat)
Puss 'n Boots Travels Around the World (1976) – Monsieur Gourmon

Video games
Crash Team Racing (1999) (Nitros Oxide)
Kingdom Hearts Birth by Sleep (2010) (Happy)
unknown date
Dragon Ball Z 3 (Grand Elder, Uranai Baba)
Dragon Ball Z Infinite World (Porunga)
Dragon Ball Z Sparking! (Porunga)
Dragon Ball Z: Sparking! Meteo (Porunga)
Dragon Ball Z Sparking! Neo (Uranai Baba, Porunga)

Dubbing

Live action
Arizona Colt (1975 TBS Dub) (Gordo Watch)
Batman (Fuji TV Dub) (The Joker) (First Voice)
Butch Cassidy and the Sundance Kid (1977 Fuji TV Dub) (Sheriff Bledsoe)
Death of a Gunfighter (1974 Fuji TV Dub) (Lester Locke)
Entrapment (2007 TV Tokyo edition) (Conrad Greene (Maury Chaykin))
Fraggle Rock (Uncle Traveling Matt) (1985 NHK dub)
Goldfinger (1978 NTV edition) (Auric Goldfinger (Gert Fröbe)) (Recorded on DVD alongside the NET Dub)
Hercule Poirot (Peter Ustinov)
I Love Lucy (Frederick 'Fred' Hobart Mertz)
The Ipcress File (1971 TBS Dub) (Blue Jay)  (Recorded on DVD)
The Island (1988 TV Asahi Dub) (Dr. Windsor)
Jingle All the Way (Fuji TV edition) (Officer Alexander Hummell)
The Lawrence of Arabia (2000 TV Tokyo Dub) (General Archibald Murray) (Recorded on DVD and Blu-Ray)
Lethal Weapon 4 (2001 Nippon TV edition) (Benny Chan)
Live and Let Die (1981 and 1988 TBS Dubs) (Sheriff J.W. Pepper) (Both Dubs are recorded on a DVD by King Records.)
Loose Cannons (VHS Dub) (Harry Gutterman) (VHS Dub is not recorded on DVD)
The Man from Hong Kong (Willard (Frank Thring))
The Man with the Golden Gun (1982 TBS Dub) (Sheriff J.W. Pepper) (Recorded on DVD by King Records)
Mary Poppins (DVD edition) (Uncle Albert)
Melody (1977 TV Asahi Dub) (Mister Perkins)
The Muppet Show (The Swedish Chef)
Muppets Tonight (Don Rickles)
My Big Fat Greek Life (Gus Portokalos)
The Runaway Bride (Walter Carpenter)
Son of the Mask (Theatrical Release edition) (Doctor Arthur Neuman)
Spartacus (DVD edition) (Gracchus)
Star Wars: Episode II – Attack of the Clones (Dexter Jettster)
The Wizard of Oz (DVD edition) (Professor Marvel, The Doorman, The Cabby, The Guard, The Wizard of Oz)

Animation
Alice in Wonderland – Caterpillar
Huckleberry Hound – Huckleberry Hound
Quick Draw McGraw – Quick Draw McGraw
The Simpsons – Grampa Simpson
Teenage Mutant Ninja Turtles (BS2 edition) – Krang

Other
Splash Mountain (Brer Owl)

References

External links
 Junpei Takiguchi at Game Plaza Haruka Voice Artist Database 
 
 
 

1931 births
2011 deaths
Voice actors from Funabashi
Male voice actors from Chiba Prefecture
Deaths from stomach cancer
Deaths from cancer in Japan
Japanese male video game actors
Japanese male voice actors
Japanese people in rail transport